A word salad, or schizophasia, is a "confused or unintelligible mixture of seemingly random words and phrases", most often used to describe a symptom of a neurological or mental disorder. The term schizophasia is used in particular to describe the confused language that may be evident in schizophrenia.  The words may or may not be grammatically correct, but are semantically confused to the point that the listener cannot extract any meaning from them. The term is often used in psychiatry as well as in theoretical linguistics to describe a type of grammatical acceptability judgement by native speakers, and in computer programming to describe textual randomization.

In psychiatry
Word salad may describe a symptom of neurological or psychiatric conditions in which a person attempts to communicate an idea, but words and phrases that may appear to be random and unrelated come out in an incoherent sequence instead.  Often, the person is unaware that he or she did not make sense.  It appears in people with dementia and schizophrenia, as well as after anoxic brain injury. In schizophrenia it is also referred to as schizophasia. Clang associations are especially characteristic of mania, as seen in bipolar disorder, as a somewhat more severe variation of flight of ideas. In extreme mania, the patient's speech may become incoherent, with associations markedly loosened, thus presenting as a veritable word salad.

It may be present as:
 Clanging, a speech pattern that follows rhyming and other sound associations rather than meaning
 Graphorrhea, a written version of word salad that is more rarely seen than logorrhea in people with schizophrenia.
 Logorrhea, a mental condition characterized by excessive talking (incoherent and compulsive)
 Receptive aphasia, fluent in speech but without making sense, often a result of a stroke or other brain injury

Deliberate use
Narcissistic word salad is a type of purposefully confusing speech, using circular reasoning, logical fallacies and other rhetorical devices to disorient and manipulate a person or group. Some antisocial and narcissistic people use it in gaslighting their targets.

In computing
Word salad can be generated by a computer program for entertainment purposes by inserting randomly chosen words of the same type (nouns, adjectives, etc.) into template sentences with missing words, a game similar to Mad Libs.  The video game company Maxis, in their seminal SimCity 2000, used this technique to create an in-game "newspaper" for entertainment; the columns were composed by taking a vague story-structure, and using randomization, inserted various nouns, adjectives, and verbs to generate seemingly unique stories.

Another way of generating meaningless text is mojibake, also called Buchstabensalat ("letter salad") in German, in which an assortment of seemingly random text is generated through character encoding incompatibility in which characters in one set are replaced by those of another. The effect is more effective in languages where each character represents a word, such as Chinese.

More serious attempts to automatically produce nonsense stem from Claude Shannon's seminal paper A Mathematical Theory of Communication from 1948 in which progressively more convincing nonsense is generated first by choosing letters and spaces randomly, then according to the frequency with which each character appears in some sample of text, then respecting the likelihood that the chosen letter appears after the preceding one or two in the sample text, and then applying similar techniques to whole words. Its most convincing nonsense is generated by second-order word approximation, in which words are chosen by a random function weighted to the likelihood that each word follows the preceding one in normal text:

Markov chains can be used to generate random but somewhat human-looking sentences. This is used in some chat-bots, especially on IRC networks.

Nonsensical phrasing can also be generated for more malicious reasons, such as the Bayesian poisoning used to counter Bayesian spam filters by using a string of words which have a high probability of being collocated in English, but with no concern for whether the sentence makes sense grammatically or logically.

See also

Similar textual productions or phenomena
 Dissociated press, a computer program that applies a Markov chain to generate word salad
 Gibberish, nonsensical language
 Lorem ipsum, placeholder text that does not have any meaning 
 Nonsense verse, verse which is nonsensical 
 Paragrammatism, inability to produce or create grammatically correct sentences 
 Thought disorder, disorder of thought

Other 
 Glossolalia, phenomenon in which people speak in languages which are unfamiliar to them
 Mad Libs, a phrasal template word game that sometimes results in word salad
 Scat singing, vocal improvisation with nonsensical words

References

External links 
 

Medical signs
Random text generation
Nonsense